The Last Image (translit. Al-soura al-akhira) is a 1986 Algerian drama film directed by Mohammed Lakhdar-Hamina. It was entered into the 1986 Cannes Film Festival. The film was selected as the Algerian entry for the Best Foreign Language Film at the 59th Academy Awards, but was not accepted as a nominee.

Cast
 Véronique Jannot as Claire Boyer
 Merwan Lakhdar-Hamina as Mouloud
 Michel Boujenah as Simon Attal
 Jean Bouise as Langlois
 Jean-François Balmer as Miller
 Hassan El-Hassani as Touhami
 José Artur as Forrestier
 Malik Lakhdar-Hamina as Bachir
 Mustapha El Anka as Kabrane
 Mustapha Preur as Boutaleb
 Geneviève Mnich as Madame Lanier
 Brigitte Catillon as Madame Lenguenel
 Rachid Fares as Omar
 Claude Melki as Jacob, le cafetier
 Mohammed Lakhdar-Hamina as Oncle Amar

See also
 List of submissions to the 59th Academy Awards for Best Foreign Language Film
 List of Algerian submissions for the Academy Award for Best Foreign Language Film

References

External links

1986 films
1986 drama films
Algerian drama films
1980s French-language films
Films directed by Mohammed Lakhdar-Hamina
Golan-Globus films